Descalvado is a municipality in the state of São Paulo, Brazil. The population is 33,910 (2020 est.) in an area of 753.7 km².

History
The city was founded firstly as a settlement in the 1830s and was one of the main coffee producer in São Paulo's golden coffee plantation years.

Economy
Descalvado's economy is farming based and sugar cane and poultry are its main products.

References

Municipalities in São Paulo (state)
Populated places established in 1832
1832 establishments in Brazil